Here's Help Network is a network of Christian radio stations in Missouri and Arkansas, and television stations in Missouri. Here's Help Network is owned by New Life Evangelistic Center, a non-profit serving the area's poor and homeless.

Here's Help Network debuted in September 1982, when its first television station KNLC in St. Louis, Missouri began broadcasting.  Here's Help Network is carried on 4 television stations and 8 radio stations.

Stations

Television stations

Radio stations

References

External links
Here's Help Network's official website
Here's Help Network's webcast

American radio networks
Television networks in the United States
Christian radio stations in the United States
Radio stations in Missouri
Religious television stations in the United States
Television stations in Missouri
Radio broadcasting companies of the United States